Indira Kastratović, née Jakupović (born 2 October 1970) is a Macedonian handball player. She is considered as one of the best Macedonian female handball players in history and one of the best right backs in the world.

In the 1997 World Women's Handball Championship she helped the Macedonian women's handball team to reach 7th place by scoring 71 goals the most at that years championship. She played for Kometal Gjorče Petrov Skopje almost her entire career and was one of their best players. She reached the final at two occasions and won the champions league with Kometal Gjorče Petrov Skopje in 2002 scoring 10 goals in the final game.

She's married to the handball coach Zoran Kastratović. She is of Bosnian origin.

Achievements
As player
Kometal Gjorce Petrov
Macedonian League: 12
Winner: 1995, 1996, 1997, 1998, 1999, 2000, 2001, 2002, 2003, 2004, 2005 and 2006 
Macedonian Cup: 12
Winner: 1995, 1996, 1997, 1998, 1999, 2000, 2001, 2002, 2003, 2004, 2005, 2006
Champions League: 1
Winner: 2002
Finalist: 2000 and 2005
Champions Trophy: 1
Winner: 2002
Semi-Finalist: 2004
As coach
ZRK Vardar
Macedonian League: 3
Winner: 2013, 2014, 2015
Macedonian Cup: 3
Winner: 2013, 2014, 2015

References

1970 births
Living people
Sportspeople from Banja Luka
Macedonian people of Montenegrin descent
Macedonian people of Bosnia and Herzegovina descent
Macedonian female handball players